Laia Marull Quintana (born 4 January 1973) is a Spanish actress. She has won three Goya Awards — Best New Actress for Fugitives (2000), Best Actress for Take My Eyes (2003), and Best Supporting Actress for Black Bread (2010). She was also nominated for European Film Award for Best Actress for Take My Eyes.

Marull is known for her work on film, television and stage, and has performed in Spanish, Catalan and French.

Biography
Laia Marull Quintana was born on 4 January 1973 in Barcelona, Catalonia, Spain. She began her career in an amateurish theatre.

Marull studied acting at the Nancy Tuñón Theater School in Barcelona. She made her acting debut in 1994 on the Catalan television channel TV3 series "Estació d'enllaç", which made her popular in Catalonia. Two years later, in 1996, she began her film career with "Razones sentimentales". 

Marull has won three Goya Awards and a Donostia Zinemaldia Silver Shell.

She is fluent in Spanish, Catalan and French, and has performed in all these languages.

Filmography

Awards and nominations

References

External links 
 

1973 births
Actresses from Barcelona
Best Actress Goya Award winners
Best Supporting Actress Goya Award winners
Actresses from Catalonia
Film actresses from Catalonia
Stage actresses from Catalonia
Television actresses from Catalonia
Living people
People from Barcelona
Spanish film actresses
Spanish stage actresses
Spanish television actresses
20th-century Spanish actresses
21st-century Spanish actresses